Bascom Deaver may refer to:

 Bascom Sine Deaver (1882–1944), American judge
 Bascom S. Deaver (born 1930), American physicist